Chronicle of a Boy Alone, also known as Chronicle of a Lonely Child, is a 1965 Argentine film directed by Leonardo Favio. It won the Silver Condor Award for Best Film.

It was selected as the greatest Argentine film of all time in a poll conducted by the Museo del Cine Pablo Ducrós Hicken in 2000. In a new version of the survey organized in 2022 by the specialized magazines La vida util, Taipei and La tierra quema, presented at the Mar del Plata International Film Festival, the film reached the 5 position.

Plot
Polin is an eleven-year-old troublemaker in reform school for unknown reasons. After suffering from harsh treatment at the hands of the staff there, Polin finally reaches a breaking point and snaps, punching one of the supervisors in the face. He is then sent to the police station where he is locked up in a cell and left alone. Polin soon breaks out and travels back to his hometown, a rural fishing village, where he meets up with his best friend and falls back into his old routine—smoking, pickpocketing, shoplifting, skinny dipping with his friends and picking fights with the neighborhood bullies—all the while trying to avoid a run-in with the law, which he knows is inevitable.

Cast
Diego Puente as Polín
Tino Pascali as Official of Justice
Óscar Espíndola as Physical Training
Victoriano Moreira as Fiori
Beto Gianola as Police
Leonardo Favio as Fabián
María Vaner as The Girl

Controversy
While on the surface a film about children, at the time of its release in 1965 the film was viewed by many as a critique on Argentina's regime. In addition to this, the film's brutal and realistic depiction of Argentina's state-run orphanages at the time caused a great deal of controversy.

The film also contains a controversial scene containing extensive, explicit nudity involving several young Argentine boys skinny dipping.

References

External links
 

1965 films
1960s Spanish-language films
Argentine black-and-white films
1965 drama films
Films directed by Leonardo Favio
1960s Argentine films